Addakal is a Mandal in Mahbubnagar district, Telangana. Historical Kandur Sri Ramalingaeshwara Swamy Temples is located at Kandur in Addakal Mandal.

References

Villages in Mahbubnagar district
Mandals in Mahbubnagar district